Shenzhen Museum is a multifunctional modern museum in Shenzhen, Guangdong, China. It has a total area of 37,000 square meters, and a building area of 18,000 square meters. The museum was established in 1981, but was not formally opened until 1988. It holds more than 20,000 historical and cultural relics, of which the majority originate within the city.

Exhibition halls that are open include the Shenzhen Museum of History and Folk Culture in Civic Center and the Shenzhen Reform and Opening-up Exhibition Hall in Futian District and the Dongjiang River Guerrilla Command Headquarters Memorial Museum in Luohu District.  Shenzhen Museum of Ancient Art in Futian District is not open to the public.

References

External links

 Shenzhen Museum
 Shenzhen Museum /

Museums in Shenzhen
National first-grade museums of China
Futian District
Luohu District